Wilfred Eldred Trenery (21 September 1867 – 23 August 1905) was an England]-born South African international rugby union player.

Trenery played provincial rugby for Griqualand West. Trenery made his only appearance for South Africa during Great Britain's 1891 tour, South Africa's first as a Test nation. He played as a forward in the 2nd Test of the three match series, at the Eclectic Cricket Ground, Kimberley, Great Britain won the game 3–0.

Trenery died in 1905, in Kimberley, at the age of 37.

References

South Africa international rugby union players
1867 births
1905 deaths
People from Hayle
Rugby union players from Cornwall
Rugby union forwards
Griquas (rugby union) players